Erna Braun is a politician in Manitoba, Canada.  She was elected to the Legislative Assembly of Manitoba in the 2007 provincial election, in the electoral division of Rossmere.  Braun is a member of the New Democratic Party.  She was the head of the Winnipeg Teachers Association.

Electoral record

References

External links
 

New Democratic Party of Manitoba MLAs
Women MLAs in Manitoba
Living people
Year of birth missing (living people)
Members of the Executive Council of Manitoba
Women government ministers of Canada
Politicians from Winnipeg
21st-century Canadian politicians
21st-century Canadian women politicians
Canadian Mennonites
Canadian Christian pacifists